Joseph Béland (November 24, 1843 – February 14, 1929) was a politician in Quebec, Canada and a Member of the Legislative Assembly of Quebec (MLA).

Early life
He was born on November 24, 1843, in Montreal.  He became a mason and a union activist.

Political career
Béland ran as a Labour candidate in the provincial district of Montréal no. 1 in the 1890 election and won. He was defeated by Conservative candidate François Martineau in the 1892 election.

Death
He died in Montreal on February 14, 1929, and is buried at Notre-Dame-des-Neiges cemetery.

References

1843 births
1929 deaths
Labour Party (Quebec) MNAs
Burials at Notre Dame des Neiges Cemetery